Jan Józef Lipski (26 May 1926 in Warsaw – 10 September 1991 in Kraków) was a Polish critic, literature historian, politician and freemason. As a soldier of the Home Army (Armia Krajowa), he fought in the Warsaw Uprising. Editor of collected works by Jan Kasprowicz, Benedykt Chmielowski and Gabriela Zapolska.

Political life
Between 1956 and 1957 Lipski was an editor of the pro-reform weekly "Po prostu"; from 1957 to 1959 he was president of the Crooked Circle Club. In 1964 Lipski organized the Letter of the 34 (objecting the expansion of censorship in communist Poland). In 1975 he signed the Letter of 59 and in 1976 he co-funded the Workers' Defence Committee (Komitet Obrony Robotnikow); as one of the most active members of this organization he organized help for the workers who protested in June 1976 against the government sponsored price increases in Radom and in Ursus district of Warsaw.

In 1980, Lipski became a member of the Solidarity Union and was elected a delegate to the 1st Delegates' Rally to represent the Masovia Region (based in Warsaw). On December 14, 1981, after the imposition of the martial law, he was arrested and charged with orchestrating a protest.

As the only senior member of the non-communist opposition, he re-established the Polish Socialist Party (Polska Partia Socjalistyczna), which he led from 1987. In 1989 he was elected Senator from Radom and was a member of the Civic Parliamentary Club (Obywatelski Klub Parlamentarny); he died during his term in office.

Honours and awards
On December 8, 1969, Lipski received the Armia Krajowa Cross, and on December 12, 1969 he was awarded the Medal of the Army for the fourth time. In 1984 awarded an honorary doctorate at the University of Paris X Nanterre.

For acts during the uprising, Lipski was decorated with the Cross of Valour (Krzyż Walecznych) ("for lifetime achievement, for the brave stance in the street fighting of 25 September, for persevering in a shed at the police station giving a small fire under a strong defence, where he was wounded, and for active participation in patrols"), posthumously awarded the Grand Cross of the Order of Polonia Restituta (by Polish President Lech Walesa on 13 September 1991) and with the highest Polish decoration, the Order of the White Eagle (by President Lech Kaczynski, 23 September 2006).

In 2000, Jacek Kuroń established the Jan Józef Lipski Open University of Teremiski.

Publications in English

Publications in Polish
 , Państwowy Instytut Wydawniczy, Warszawa 1967
 , Państwowy Instytut Wydawniczy, Warszawa 1973 (dwutomowa antologia felietonu prasowego)
 , Aneks, London 1983; 2nd ed. Instytut Pamięci Narodowej, Warszawa 2006
 , Kultura, Paris 1981
 , Instytut Literacki, Paryż 1987
 , PEN, Warszawa 1992
 , Aneks, Londyn 1994
 , Wydawnictwo Polsko-Niemieckie, Warszawa 1996 (bilingual German-Polish edition)

References

An article at the Heritage Foundation website
Jan Józef Lipski Open University of Teremiski website (in Polish)



1926 births
1991 deaths
Members of the Workers' Defence Committee
Polish resistance members of World War II
Politicians from Warsaw
Solidarity (Polish trade union) activists
Polish Socialist Party politicians
Recipients of the Cross of Valour (Poland)
Grand Crosses of the Order of Polonia Restituta
Recipients of the Armia Krajowa Cross
Warsaw Uprising insurgents
Members of the Senate of Poland 1989–1991
Polish dissidents
Recipients of the Order of the White Eagle (Poland)
People associated with the magazine "Kultura"